Vítor Manuel da Silva Caldeira (born 1960) is former President of the Portuguese Court of Auditors (2016-2020) and former President of the European Court of Auditors.
He was born in Campo Maior, Portugal.

He has a degree in Law from the University of Lisbon and a postgraduate degree in European Studies from the European Institute of the Faculty of Law at that university.

He was an assistant professor at the Faculty of Law of Lisbon University from 1983 to 1984, and he worked at the Inspectorate General of Finance at the Portuguese Ministry of Finance from 1984 to 2000. From 1996 to 1999 he was an assistant professor at the Higher Institute of the New Professions.

Caldeira was elected President of the European Court of Auditors for a term of three years from 16 January 2008. His mandate was renewed on 12 January 2011 for a second term, and on 23 January 2014 for a third term.

References 

European Court of Auditors
Living people
1960 births
People from Portalegre District